Mindy McCready is the fourth studio album from American country music singer Mindy McCready. It was released on Capitol Nashville in 2002 as her only album for the label. This album peaked at #29 on the US country charts. The album included three singles, "Scream", "Maybe, Maybe Not" (later recorded by Mila Mason on her 2003 album Stained Glass Window), and "Lips Like Yours". Steve Mandile, lead singer of the band Sixwire, co-wrote the track "Don't Speak".  "The Fire" was originally recorded by Chely Wright on her 1999 album Single White Female.

The album was produced by Billy Joe Walker, Jr., except for "Maybe, Maybe Not" and "Be with Me", which were produced by Mike Clute and Bobby Huff.

Track listing

Personnel

 Larry Beaird – acoustic guitar
 Larry Byrom – acoustic guitar, electric guitar, slide guitar
 Pat Coil – synthesizer
 Glen Duncan – fiddle
 Thom Flora – background vocals
 Paul Franklin – steel guitar
 David Grissom – electric guitar
 Aubrey Haynie – fiddle, mandolin, laughs
 Wes Hightower – background vocals
 Bobby Huff – drums, background vocals
 Joanna Janét – background vocals
 John Barlow Jarvis – keyboards, Hammond organ, piano, Wurlitzer
 Carolyn Dawn Johnson – background vocals
 Mary Ann Kennedy – background vocals
 Paul Leim – drums, percussion
 B. James Lowry – acoustic guitar
 Mindy McCready – lead vocals
 Brent Mason – electric guitar, gut string guitar
 Gene Miller – background vocals
 Duncan Mullins – bass guitar
 Steve Nathan – keyboards, Hammond organ, piano, synthesizer, Wurlitzer
 Jimmy Nichols – keyboards, piano
 Dale Oliver – electric guitar
 Russ Pahl – Dobro
 Pam Rose – background vocals
 Lisa Silver – background vocals
 Billy Joe Walker Jr. – acoustic guitar, electric guitar
 Biff Watson – acoustic guitar
 Glenn Worf – bass guitar
 Reese Wynans – Hammond organ

Chart performance

Notes

2002 albums
Capitol Records albums
Mindy McCready albums
Albums produced by Billy Joe Walker Jr.